Water transport played a vital role in the UK's industrial development. The beginning of the 19th century saw a move from roads to waterways, (i.e. canals, rivers, firths, and estuaries).

Rivers in the United Kingdom

Major navigable rivers include the Humber, Mersey, Yorkshire Ouse, Severn, Thames and Trent.  Some minor navigable rivers may be classified as canals.  Others include the Warwickshire Avon, the Bristol Avon.

There are also the subterranean rivers of London, and the Jubilee River, which, although man-made, was designed to look and act like a natural river rather than a canal.

Canals in the United Kingdom

The canals of the United Kingdom are a major part of the network of inland waterways. They are used for irrigation and transport and were a key part of the Industrial Revolution. Today, they are also used for recreational boating.

See also

British Waterways Waterscape
Canal & River Trust
Inland Waterways Association
Falkirk Helix
Geography of the United Kingdom
List of navigation authorities in the United Kingdom
List of waterway societies in the United Kingdom
World Canals Conference

External links

 
Geography of the United Kingdom
United Kingdom transport-related lists
Lists of landforms of the United Kingdom